An election to the County Council of London took place on 16 April 1958. The council was elected by First Past the Post with each elector having three votes in the three-member seats. The Labour Party, who had already run the council for 24 years, won their largest ever majority.

Campaign
The Labour Party were optimistic about making gains, and targeted seats in Battersea South, Clapham, Lewisham West, Wandsworth Central and Woolwich West.  The Conservatives targeted the marginal Labour-held constituencies of Barons Court, Kensington North and Paddington North.  Their manifesto argued that the Labour Party were wasting money; they proposed reducing rates, and encouraged Londoners to move to new towns.

The Liberal Party stood 31 candidates, but reports suggested that they were hampered by poor organisation, and were not optimistic of taking a seat.  The Communist Party of Great Britain and the Independent Labour Party each stood four candidates, while the Socialist Party of Great Britain stood three, and there were seven independents.

Results
The Labour Party gained 27 seats from the Conservatives, giving them a record majority on the council.

References

London County Council election
County Council election
London County Council election
London County Council elections
London County Council election